Qaem Shahr County (also Qa'em Shahr and Ghaemshahr) is in Mazandaran province, Iran. The capital of the county is the city of Qaem Shahr. At the 2006 census, the county's population was 293,721 in 79,707 households. The following census in 2011 counted 320,741 people in 97,552 households. At the 2016 census, the county's population was 309,199 in 102,950 households, by which time Kiakola District had been separated from the county to form Simorgh County.

The city was previously known as Aliabad. With the Pahlavi dynasty, the city changed its name to Shahi in honor of Reza Shah, who was born in Alasht, a village close by. The county has been renamed to Qaem Shahr after the 1979 revolution. Qaemshahr is located in the junction of the two major transit roads of Haraz and Firûzkûh, which connect Mazandaran to the capital of Iran, Tehran.

Administrative divisions

The population history and structural changes of Qaem Shahr County's administrative divisions over three consecutive censuses are shown in the following table. The latest census shows one district, five rural districts, and two cities.

References

 

Counties of Mazandaran Province